Damian Lynch (born 31 July 1979, in Dublin) is a retired  Irish professional footballer whose last club was League of Ireland side St Patrick's Athletic.

From Santry, where he played his soccer with St Kevin's before he was enticed across to Leeds United. He was a member of the Leeds team that won the FA Youth Cup in 1997 when his teammates included Harry Kewell, Jonathan Woodgate, and Stephen McPhail. Lynch played for the Republic of Ireland national under-19 football team in the 1997 UEFA European Under-18 Football Championship finals in Iceland. He has also been capped several times by the Republic of Ireland at Under 21 level. Much of his career has been ravaged by a series of injuries, mainly shin splints and groin problems. Released by Leeds, he was signed by Nottingham Forest in October 2001 where he played reserve team football.

His former clubs include Drogheda United (with whom he won the League of Ireland), Bohemians, Nottingham Forest and Leeds United . Damian signed for the Saints in 2008 from Drogheda and played an important part in their UEFA Cup 2008–09 campaign .

Lynch scored twice in the UEFA Cup for Drogheda in 2006 against HJK Helsinki  .

His final game in professional football was away to Drogheda United in a 1–0 win for The Saints on 5 October 2010 .

His older brother Aidan Lynch also played in the League of Ireland.

Honours 
Leeds United
 FA Youth Cup (1): 1997

Bohemians
 League of Ireland (1): 2002-03

Drogheda United
 League of Ireland (1): 2007
 FAI Cup (1): 2005
 Setanta Sports Cup (2): 2006, 2007

External links 

Lynch strike buries Dundalk

Bohemian F.C. players
Drogheda United F.C. players
St Patrick's Athletic F.C. players
League of Ireland players
Association footballers from County Dublin
Republic of Ireland under-21 international footballers
Republic of Ireland association footballers
Republic of Ireland youth international footballers
Living people
1979 births
Association football defenders